RQDA is an R package for computer assisted qualitative data analysis or CAQDAS. It is installable from, and runs within, the R statistical software, but has a separate window running a graphical user interface (through RGtk2). RQDA's approach allows for tight integration of the constructivist approach of qualitative research with quantitative data analysis which can increase the rigor, transparency and validity of qualitative research.

Features
In the graphical interface it has the following functions:
 Import documents from plain text
 Support non-English documents, Simplified Chinese Character is well-tested under Windows
 Support character-level coding
 Memos for documents, codes, coding, project, files etc.
 Retrieve coding, and easily gets back to the original file. Conditional retrieval is supported as well.
 Single-file (*.rqda) format, which is basically the SQLite database
 Categorize codes (tree-like categories are avoided)
 Categorize files
 Search files by keywords and can highlight keyword in the open file
 Show attributes of files, which is useful for content analysis
 Categorise cases and related attributes of cases (to bridge qualitative and quantitative research)
 Search information about selected cases from the web
 Rename files, codes, code categories, cases etc.
 Write and organize fieldwork journals

Through use of R functions, it can:
 Import a batch of files
 Calculate the relation between two codings, given the coding indexes
 Give a summary of coding and inter-code relationship.
 Export file/case attributes and show subset of files/cases.
 Allow for more flexible conditional retrieval.
 Boolean operations of and, or and not.

See also
 Computer-assisted qualitative data analysis software

References

External links
 
 RQDA video tutorials
 Tutorial "Qualitative Data Analysis in R"
 Warner, L. (2012). Eval12 Session 682: R Qualitative Data Analysis (RQDA) Package: A Free Qualitative Analysis Tool (skill-building presentation)
 Scholarly research using RQDA

Free QDA software
Cross-platform free software
Free R (programming language) software
Qualitative research
Science software for macOS
Science software for Linux